East Ridge High School may refer to:
East Ridge High School (Florida) - Clermont, Florida
East Ridge High School (Kentucky) - Lick Creek, Kentucky
East Ridge High School (Minnesota) - Woodbury, Minnesota
East Ridge High School (Tennessee) - East Ridge, Tennessee
Eastridge High School - Irondequoit, New York